HMS Aberfoyle was a tender of the British Royal Navy . The vessel was purchased on 4 November 1920 Lough Swilly Steamboat Company in Derry. The vessel was named in March 1938 as HMS Dolphin and was placed as a mother ship in Portsmouth. The ship was sold in 1947.

Sources
Colledge, JJ & Warlow, Ben:  Ships of the Royal Navy - The Complete Record of the Fighting Ships of the Royal Navy from the 15th Century to the Present . Newbury, UK: Casemate, 2010.  . (in English)
Gardiner, Robert (ed.):  Conway's All-World's Fighting Ships 1922-1946 . London, England: Conway Maritime Press, 1987.  . (in English)
Lenton, HT & Colledge, JJ:  Warships of World War II . London, UK: Ian Allan Ltd. (in English)

References

1912 ships